Malik Pur or Malak Pur is a union council in the Buner District in the Khyber Pakhtunkhwa province of Pakistan.

District Buner has 6 Tehsils i.e. Daggar, Chagharzai, Chamla, Khudu Khel, Gagra and Gadezai. Each tehsil comprises certain numbers of union councils. There are 27 union councils in Buner District.

Buner District
Populated places in Buner District
Union councils of Khyber Pakhtunkhwa
Union Councils of Buner District